The 1991 World Indoor Target Archery Championships were held in Oulu, Finland. It was the first ever World Indoor Championship.

Medal summary (Men's individual)

Medal summary (Women's individual)

Notes 
The Freestyle event would change its name to the Recurve event at later championships.

References

E
International archery competitions hosted by Finland
1991 in Finnish sport